The Sir Bernard Heinze Memorial Award, was inaugurated following the death of Sir Bernard Heinze in 1982.

The award is in the form of a medallion and is given to a person who has made an outstanding contribution to music in Australia.

The Award honours the memory of Sir Bernard Heinze (1894 – 1982), who for 31 years was Ormond Professor of Music at the University of Melbourne, and one of the major pioneers of orchestral life in Australia.

List of Bernard Heinze Award recipients
 1986 Ruth Alexander
 1987 Professor Emeritus Sir Frank Callaway 
 1988 Malcolm Williamson 
 1989 Patrick Thomas 
 1990 Beryl Kimber
 1991 John Hopkins 
 1992 Leonard Dommett
 1993 Peter Sculthorpe 
 1994 Yvonne Kenny 
 1995 Jan Sedivka 
 1996 Richard Mills 
 1997 Donald Hazelwood 
 1998 Richard Gill 
 1999 Don Burrows 
 2000 John Curro 
 2001 John Painter 
 2002 Stephen McIntyre 
 2003 Graeme Koehne 
 2004 Richard Divall 
 2005 Richard Tognetti 
 2006 Graham Abbott
 2007 Barry Tuckwell 
 2008 Richard Bonynge 
 2009 Brett Dean
 2010 Simone Young 
 2011 Carl Vine 
 2012 Roger Covell 
 2013 John Williams
 2014 Anne Boyd 
 2015 Margaret Kartomi 
 2016 Mary Vallentine 
 2017 Ronald Farren-Price 
 2018 Judy Bailey 
 2019 Deborah Cheetham 
 2020 Richard Letts 
 2021 Lyn Williams 
 2022 Piers Lane

References

Classical music awards
Australian music awards
Awards established in 1982
1982 establishments in Australia